Sir Orlando Bridgeman, 4th Baronet (2 July 1695 – 25 July 1764) was a British baronet and politician.

Born in Blodwell in Shropshire, he was the oldest son of Sir John Bridgeman, 3rd Baronet and his wife Ursula, daughter of Roger Matthews. Bridgeman was educated at New College, Oxford and in 1713, he was called to the bar by the Inner Temple. In 1723, he entered the British House of Commons, sitting for Shrewsbury in the next four years. He succeeded his father as baronet on the latter's death in 1747.

On 8 April 1719, Bridgeman married Anne Newport, third daughter of Richard Newport, 2nd Earl of Bradford. They had three sons and two daughters. His wife died in 1752 and Bridgeman survived her until 1764, aged 69; both were buried at Weston Park in the county of Staffordshire. His oldest son having predeceased him, he was succeeded in the baronetcy by his second son Henry, who later was raised to the peerage as Baron Bradford.

References

1695 births
1764 deaths
Alumni of New College, Oxford
Baronets in the Baronetage of England
British MPs 1722–1727
Members of the Inner Temple
Members of the Parliament of Great Britain for English constituencies
Orlando